Bruce Levine may refer to:

 Bruce E. Levine, American psychologist
 Bruce N. Levine (born 1955), American racehorse trainer